Juan Pérez de la Serna (1570 – August 8, 1631), was a Spanish Catholic prelate who served as Archbishop of Zamora (1627–1631) and as the seventh Archbishop of Mexico (1613–1627).

Biography
Juan Pérez de la Serna was born in Cervera del Llano, Spain. On May 13, 1613, he was appointed by the King of Spain and confirmed by Pope Paul V as  the seventh Archbishop of Mexico. On July 19, 1627, he was appointed by Pope Urban VIII as Archbishop (personal title) of the Diocese of Zamora, Spain where he served until his death on August 8, 1631. He died in Zamora, Spain.

Episcopal succession
While bishop, he was the principal consecrator of:

and principal co-consecrator of:
Sebastião de Matos de Noronha (1626), Bishop of Elvas.

See also 
 Diego Carrillo de Mendoza y Pimentel for his dispute with the viceroy of New Spain

References

External links and additional sources
 (for Chronology of Bishops) 
 (for Chronology of Bishops) 
 (for Chronology of Bishops) 
 (for Chronology of Bishops) 
 List of Archbishops of Mexico

1573 births
1631 deaths
17th-century Roman Catholic archbishops in Spain
17th-century Roman Catholic archbishops in Mexico
Roman Catholic archbishops of Mexico (city)
Spanish Roman Catholic bishops in North America
Bishops of Zamora